George of Guria may refer to:

 Giorgi I Gurieli (1483–1512), sovereign prince
 George III of Guria, prince of Guria in 1664–1684 
 George IV of Guria, prince in 1711–1726